A crop wild relative (CWR) is a wild plant closely related to a domesticated plant. It may be a wild ancestor of the domesticated (cultivated) plant or another closely related taxon.

Overview 
The wild relatives of crop plants constitute an increasingly important resource for improving agricultural production and for maintaining sustainable agro-ecosystems. Their natural selection in the wild accumulates a rich set of useful traits that can be introduced into crop plants by crossing. With the advent of anthropogenic climate change and greater ecosystem instability CWRs are likely to prove a critical resource in ensuring food security for the new millennium. It was Nikolai Vavilov, the Russian botanist who first realized the importance of crop wild relatives in the early 20th century. Genetic material from CWRs has been utilized by humans for thousands of years to improve the quality and yield of crops. Farmers have used traditional breeding methods for millennia, wild maize (Zea mexicana) is routinely grown alongside maize to promote natural crossing and improve yields. More recently, plant breeders have utilised CWR genes to improve a wide range of crops like rice (Oryza sativa), tomato (Solanum lycopersicum) and grain legumes.

CWRs have contributed many useful genes to crop plants, and modern varieties of most major crops now contain genes from their wild relatives. Therefore, CWRs are wild plants related to socio-economically important species including food, fodder and forage crops, medicinal plants, condiments, ornamental, and forestry species, as well as plants used for industrial purposes, such as oils and fibres, and to which they can contribute beneficial traits. A CWR can be defined as "... a wild plant taxon that has an indirect use derived from its relatively close genetic relationship to a crop...”

Conservation of crop wild relatives 

CWRs are essential components of natural and agricultural ecosystems and hence are indispensable for maintaining ecosystem health. Their conservation and sustainable use is very important for improving agricultural production, increasing food security, and maintaining a healthy environment.

The natural populations of many CWRs are increasingly at risk. They are threatened by habitat loss through the destruction and degradation of natural environment or their conversion to other uses. Deforestation is leading to the loss of many populations of important wild relatives of fruit, nut, and industrial crops. Populations of wild relatives of cereal crops that occur in arid or semi-arid lands are being severely reduced by over grazing and resulting desertification. The growing industrialization of agriculture is drastically reducing the occurrence of CWRs within the traditional agro-ecosystems. The wise conservation and use of CWRs are essential elements for increasing food security, eliminating poverty, and maintaining the environment.

Conservation strategies for CWRs often consider both in situ and ex situ conservation. These are complementary approaches to CWR conservation, since each has its own advantages and disadvantages. For example, whilst ex situ conservation protects CWR (or more correctly, their genes) from threats in the wild, it can limit evolution and adaptation to new environmental challenges.

In 2016, 29% of wild relative plant species were completely missing from the world’s genebanks, with a further 24% represented by fewer than 10 samples. Over 70% of all crop wild relative species worldwide were in urgent need of further collecting to improve their representation in genebanks, and over 95% were insufficiently represented with regard to the full range of geographic and ecological variation in their native distributions. While the most critical priorities for further collecting were found in the Mediterranean and Near East, Western and Southern Europe, Southeast and East Asia, and South America, crop wild relatives insufficiently represented in genebanks are distributed across almost all countries worldwide.

Examples of wild relatives

Grains 
 Oats (Avena sativa) – Avena byzantina
 Quinoa (Chenopodium quinoa) – Chenopodium berlandieri
 Finger Millet (Eleusine coracana) – Eleusine africana
 Barley (Hordeum vulgare) – Hordeum arizonicum and Hordeum spontaneum
 Rice (Oryza sativa) – Oryza rufipogon
 African Rice (Oryza glaberrima) – Oryza barthii
 Pearl Millet (Pennisetum glaucum) – Pennisetum purpureum
 Rye (Secale cereale subsp. cereale) – Secale cereale subsp. dighoricum
 Sorghum (Sorghum bicolor) – Sorghum arundinaceum and Sorghum halepense
 Broom millet (Panicum miliaceum) – Panicum fauriei
 Wheat (Triticum aestivum) – Einkorn wheat (Triticum monococcum)
 Maize (Zea mays subsp. mays) –  Zea diploperennis

Vegetables 

Note: Many different vegetables share one common ancestor, particularly in the Brassica genus of plants (cruciferous vegetables). Many vegetables are also hybrids of different species, again this is particularly true of Brassicas (see e.g. triangle of U).
 Asparagus (Asparagus officinalis) – Asparagus dauricus
 Beet (Beta vulgaris subsp. vulgaris) – Beta vulgaris subsp. maritima
 Black Mustard (Brassica nigra) – Wild mustard (Sinapis arvensis)
 Cabbage (Brassica oleracea var. capitata) - Brassica elongata
 Carrot (Daucus carota) – Daucus gracilis
 Garlic (Allium sativum var. sativum) – Allium atroviolaceum
 Leek (Allium ampeloprasum) – Welsh onion (Allium fistulosum)
 Lettuce (Lactuca sativa) – Prickly lettuce (Lactuca serriola)
 Mustard (Brassica juncea subsp. juncea) – Brassica carinata
 Onion (Allium cepa var. cepa) – Allium galanthum
 Rape (Brassica napus var. napus) – Common dogmustard (Erucastrum gallicum)
 Spinach (Spinacea oleracea) – Spinacia turkestanica
 Squash (Cucurbita pepo subsp. pepo) – Cucurbita okeechobeensis
 Turnip (Brassica rapa subsp. rapa) – Brassica rapa

Fruits 
 Almond (Prunus dulcis) – Chinese plum (Prunus salicina and many others)
 Apple (Malus domestica) – mostly Malus sieversii, but with some cultivars perhaps belonging to Malus sylvestris or being a hybrid of the two.
 Apricot (Prunus armeniaca) – Prunus brigantina
 Avocado (Persea americana) – Persea schiedeana
 Banana – Musa acuminata, Musa balbisiana and Musa schizocarpa
 Breadfruit (Artocarpus altilis) – Jackfruit (Artocarpus heterphyllus)
 Cacao (Theobroma cacao) – Theobroma angustifolium
 Cherry (Prunus avium) – Prunus mahaleb
 Cucumber (Cucumis sativus) – Cucumis hystrix
 Eggplant (Solanum melongena) – Thorn apple (Solanum incanum), Solanum insanum
 Grape (Vitis vinifera) – European wild grape (Vitis sylvestris). Hybrids exist also including other Vitis species.
 Grapefruit (Citrus paradisi) – Citrus medica
 Lemon (Citrus limon) – Citrus indica
 Mango (Mangifera indica) – Mangifera altissima
 Orange (Citrus sinensis) – Key lime (Citrus aurantiifolia)
 Papaya (Carica papaya) – Jarilla chocola
 Peach (Prunus persica var. persica) – Prunus tomentosa
 Pear (Pyrus communis) – Pyrus pyraster and Pyrus caucasica
 Pepper (Capsicum annuum) – Capsicum baccatum
 Pineapple (Ananas comosus) – Ananas bracteatus
 Plum (Prunus domesticus subsp. domestica)- Prunus spinosa and Prunus cerasifera
 Pumpkin (Cucurbita maxima subsp. maxima) – Cucurbita ecuadorensis
 Strawberry (Fragaria× ananassa)
 Tomato (Solanum lycopersicum) – Solanum chilense
 Watermelon (Citrullus lanatus var. lanatus) – Bitter apple (Citrullus colocynthis)

Oilseeds 
 Peanut (Arachis hypogaea subsp. hypogaea) – Arachis duranensis
 Sunflower (Helianthus annuus) – Helianthus exilis
 Soya (Glycine max) – Glycine clandestina
 Safflower (Carthamus tinctorius) – Carthamus creticus
 Rapeseed (Brassica napus) – Brassica rapa, Brassica oleracea

Pulses 

 Lentil (Lens culinaris) – Lens ervoides
 Garden Pea (Pisum sativum) – Pisum fulvum
 Butter Bean (Phaseolus lunatus) – Phaseolus augusti
 Garden Bean (Phaseolus vulgaris) – Phaseolus coccineus
 Faba Bean (Vicia faba) – Vicia johannis
 Grasspea (Lathyrus sativus) – Lathyrus tuberosus
 Cowpea (Vigna unguiculata) – Vigna monantha
 Bambara groundnut (Vigna subterranea) – Vigna hosei
 Pigeonpea (Cajanus cajan) – Cajanus albicans, Cajanus scarabaeoides, Cajanus sericeus, Cajanus acutifolius
 Chickpea (Cicer arietinum) – Cicer reticulatum, Cicer echinospermum
 Vetch (Vicia sativa) – Vicia barbazitae
 Adzuki bean (Vigna angularis var. angularis) – Vigna umbellata
 Black gram bean (Vigna mungo var. mungo) – Vigna grandiflora
 Mung bean (Vigna radiata var. radiata) – Vigna stipulacea

Forages 

 Alfalfa (Medicago sativa) - Medicago arborea and Medicago truncatula

Tubers 
 Sweet potato (Ipomoea batatas) – Ipomoea triloba, Ipomoea cynanchifolia, Ipomoea leucantha and Ipomoea trifida
 Cassava (Manihot esculenta subsp. esculenta) – Manihot walkerae
 Potato (Solanum tuberosum) – Solanum chacoense

See also 
 List of domesticated plants
 Wild type
 Agricultural biodiversity
 Agriculture
 Agronomy
 Gene pool
 Australian Grains Genebank
 Plant genetic resources

References

External links 
 Crop Wild Relatives Inventory and Gap Analysis
 European Crop Wild Relative Diversity Assessment and Conservation Forum
 Beyond the Gardens: The Crop Wild Relatives Project (Vimeo Video)
  A short video on emmer wheat.
 Short DIVERSEEDS video on crop wild relatives in the fertile crescent in Israel
 Atlas of Guatemalan Crop Wild Relatives
 Bioversity International - Crop Wild Relatives

Agroecology
Crops
Habitat management equipment and methods